This is a list of Salgaocar Sports Club's managers and their records, from 2001, when the first professional manager was appointed, to the present day.

Managers
Information correct as of 13 November 2012. Only competitive matches are counted. Wins, losses and draws are results at the final whistle; the results of penalty shoot-outs are not counted.